Point Island may refer to:

 Apple Orchard Point Island, Australia
 Double Island Point, Australia
 Gardiners Point Island, New York, USA
 Point Islands, Nunavut
 Rocky Point Island (Queensland), Australia
 West Point Island, Falkland Islands